Zhenjiang Vinegar Culture Museum is a museum dedicated to vinegar in Yicheng Subdistrict, Dantu District, Zhenjiang, Jiangsu, China. It is located in Zhenjiang, a city famous for its Zhenjiang vinegar. It is an AAAA Tourist attraction.

The museum documents the history of vinegar production, contains a recreation of an ancient vinegar workshop, and also documents the modern vinegar production process.

History 
The museum opened in 2010, built by Hengshun Group and becoming the first museum in Zhenjiang dedicated to preserving historical culture.

See also 
 International Vinegar Museum

References 

Buildings and structures in Zhenjiang
Tourist attractions in Zhenjiang
Vinegar